This is a list of submissions to the 81st Academy Awards for Best Foreign Language Film. The Academy of Motion Picture Arts and Sciences has invited the film industries of various countries to submit their best film for the Academy Award for Best Foreign Language Film every year since the award was created in 1956. The award is handed out annually by the Academy to a feature-length motion picture produced outside the United States that contains primarily non-English dialogue. The Foreign Language Film Award Committee oversees the process and reviews all the submitted films.

For the 81st Academy Awards, the Academy invited 96 countries to submit films for the Academy Award for Best Foreign Language Film. Only one film was accepted from each country, and the deadline by which copies of all submitted films must be sent to the Academy was October 1, 2008. The Academy of Motion Picture Arts and Sciences released its official list of submissions on October 17, 2008. Submission of a film does not mean automatic qualification for competition: the Academy has the final word on eligibility and has in the past disqualified several submissions. The Academy of Motion Picture Arts and Sciences announced that a "record 67-strong" list of films were submitted for the competition. The Middle Eastern kingdom of Jordan submitted a film for the first time and Latvia returned to the competition after a 15-year absence.

The Oscar Foreign Film Committee began screening the foreign film entries on October 17, 2008. A shortlist of nine semi-finalists was announced January 13, 2009. Due to a new rule, only six films on the shortlist were decided based on the votes of the at-large committee. The other three were selected by the Academy's foreign film executive committee. The official nominees were announced on January 22, 2009. The winner of the Academy Award for Best Foreign Language Film was Japan's Departures.

Submissions
The following is based upon the official list by the Academy of Motion Picture Arts and Sciences.

Notes
  In addition, the South Korean submission Crossing was initially in question when it was accused of plagiarism by a rival writer. The Korean Film Council said it would select another submission if Crossing was found guilty, but the case was ultimately dismissed and the film was retained.
  Vietnam's Ministry of Culture, Sports and Tourism launched an open call for films to represent the country, but only received one entry - Vuong Duc's Rừng đen (Black Forest). On September 29, the Ministry decided not to send any film since Forest did not meet Oscar requirements to have run one consecutive week in a commercial cinema.
 Bolivia and Puerto Rico, formally announced at the end of September that they would not be participating in this year's competition.

References
General

Specific

External links
Official website of the Academy Awards

81